Dave Whinham (born January 2, 1957) is a sports and entertainment executive, filmmaker, and former American football coach and team executive. Whinham formed in 2002 and has since served as president of a consulting and production company now known as The TEAM Productions. Based in Columbus, OH, The TEAM focuses its efforts in four areas: (1) brokering of sports and entertainment opportunities and entities, (2) providing comprehensive consulting services to the sports and entertainment industry, (3) producing live sports and entertainment events, and (4) creating, producing, and placing media elements. Whinham resides in Columbus and is a native of Detroit.

Coaching career
Whinham coached college football for seven years, including two stints at his alma mater Grand Valley State University, one at Wayne State University and one at the University of Cincinnati. He began his coaching career as an assistant at Grand Valley State. He was a graduate assistant at Cincinnati in 1984.

He joined the Detroit Drive as an assistant coach in 1988, winning ArenaBowl II in 1988 and ArenaBowl IV in 1990. He was the strength coach of the Detroit Red Wings of the National Hockey League during the 1990–91 season.

Whinham was head coach of the Columbus/Cleveland Thunderbolts from 1991 to 1993, compiling a regular season record of 6–26. He was rehired by the Thunderbolts on March 12, 1992. The Thunderbolts made the playoffs in 1992.

He was later an assistant coach for the Tampa Bay Storm from 1995 to 1997, winning ArenaBowl IX in 1995 and X in 1996.

Whinham simultaneously served as vice president of two arenafootball2 franchises, the Baton Rouge Blaze and the Lafayette Roughnecks, in 2001. He also took over as interim head coach of the Lafayette Roughnecks of the AF2 after Buford Jordan was fired following a 3–8 start to the 2001 season.

Front Office and Administrative Career
Whinham was the general manager of the Columbus/Cleveland Thunderbolts from 1991 to 1992. He was the director of player personnel of the Tampa Bay Storm from 1995 to 1997. He served as Vice President of Operations and General Manager for the Buffalo Destroyers from 1998 to 2000, where he placed, trained, and directed a staff that produced record-setting sales numbers in all ticket sales categories, sponsorship sales, and merchandise sales. He was vice president of the Lafayette Roughnecks of the af2 in 2001. He served as vice president of the Baton Rouge Blaze of the af2 in 2001. Whinham became president of the Columbus Destroyers in fall 2003 and left the team after the 2004 season. He was president of the Dallas Vigilantes from 2010 to 2011.

References

External links
ArenaFan stats
Just Sports Stats

Living people
1957 births
Af2 coaches
Arena Football League executives
Cincinnati Bearcats football coaches
Cleveland Thunderbolts coaches
Columbus Destroyers coaches
Detroit Red Wings coaches
Massachusetts Marauders coaches
Grand Valley State Lakers football coaches
Grand Valley State University alumni
Tampa Bay Storm coaches
Wayne State Warriors football coaches
Lafayette Roughnecks coaches
Coaches of American football from Michigan
Sportspeople from Detroit